Louis Léonard Antoine de Colli-Ricci (23 March 1760 – 31 March 1806) was an Italian general.

1760 births
1806 deaths
18th-century Italian people
19th-century Italian people
Italian generals
People from Alessandria
Italian commanders of the Napoleonic Wars
Names inscribed under the Arc de Triomphe